The following elections occurred in the year 1949.

Asia

Afghanistan
 1949 Afghan parliamentary election

Iran
 1949 Iranian Senate elections

Israel
 1949 Israeli legislative election
 1949 Israeli presidential election

Japan
 1949 Japanese general election

Philippines 
 1949 Philippine House of Representatives elections
 1949 Philippine Senate election
 1949 Philippine general election
 1949 Philippine presidential election

Europe

Albania
 1949 Albanian parliamentary election

Austria
 1949 Austrian legislative election

Belgium
 1949 Belgian general election

Germany
 1949 German presidential election 
 1949 West German federal election
 Bürgerschaftswahl in Hamburg 16 October 1949 (see also Max Brauer)

Hungary
 1949 Hungarian parliamentary election

Iceland
 1949 Icelandic parliamentary election

Norway 
 1949 Norwegian parliamentary election

Portugal
 1949 Portuguese legislative election

Trieste
 1949 Free Territory of Trieste municipal election

United Kingdom
 1949 Bradford South by-election
 Elections in England and Wales, 1949
 1949 Northern Ireland general election

United Kingdom local
 Elections in England and Wales, 1949
 1949 Manchester Council election

English local
 1949 Bermondsey Borough election
 1949 Southwark Borough election

North America

Canada
 1949 Canadian federal election
 1949 British Columbia general election
 1949 Edmonton municipal election
 1949 Manitoba general election
 1949 Newfoundland general election
 1949 Nova Scotia general election
 1949 Progressive Conservative Party of Ontario leadership election
 1949 Toronto municipal election
 1949 Yukon general election

Mexico
 1949 Mexican legislative election

United States
 1949 New York state election
 1949 Pittsburgh mayoral election
 1945 Pittsburgh mayoral election

Oceania

Australia
 1949 Australian federal election
 1949 Ipswich state by-election
 1949 Kurilpa state by-election

French Oceania
 French legislative by-election in French Oceania, 1949

New Zealand
 1949 New Zealand general election

South America

Falkland Islands
 1949 Falkland Islands general election

See also
 :Category:1949 elections

 
1949
Elections